The Agricultural College and Research Institute, Killikulam (AC & RI, Killikulam) is the third constituent Agricultural college of Tamil Nadu Agricultural University located in Killikulam, Vallanadu, Tuticorin.

Mandate

This institute covers three main aspects,

Education
Research
Extension

Departments

This institute has seven departments. They are

Department of Agronomy
Department of Plant breeding and Genetics
Department of Soil science and Agricultural Chemistry
Department of Horticulture
Department of Agriculture Entomology
Department of Social Sciences
Department of Plant Pathology
Department of Farm Management

Geography

The campus and its farm is geographically located in 8°46 N latitude and 77°42 E longitude and at an altitude of 40 m above MSL. The mean annual rainfall of the farm is 736.7 mm which is being received in 40 rainy days. The campus is situated near the foot hills of the Vallanadu Black buck Sanctuary. It covers the area of about 476.61 hectares. In this vast area the institute has Watershed development area and a tank called killikulam tank. The farm area has been allocated to various departments for research and Seed production.

Facilities

This institute is equipped with laboratory for all its seven Departments.Also the campus is equipped with Library, Computer center, Gym, Auditorium, Playground and Examination hall with On line examination facility.

References

External links 

 

Agricultural universities and colleges in Tamil Nadu
Education in Thoothukudi
1985 establishments in Tamil Nadu
Educational institutions established in 1985